The Essen Stadtbahn ( is a  light rail (Stadtbahn) network in Essen and the two neighbouring towns of Mülheim an der Ruhr and Gelsenkirchen in the German state of North Rhine Westphalia. It forms part of the Rhine-Ruhr Stadtbahn.

Like the Frankfurt U-Bahn, it is a mixed system of light rail and underground railway. One of its three lines, U18, runs completely free of intersections with other traffic. The other two lines are partly tramlines and partly underground lines. The sections of tramline have only a few sections that have no intersections with road traffic.

Like all urban public transport in Essen, the Essen Stadtbahn is operated by Ruhrbahn, a company owned by the Cities of Essen and Mülheim an der Ruhr.  The transport companies of neighbouring municipalities are also involved with the operation of some lines under concessions.

Operations 

The Essen Stadtbahn includes three standard gauge lines: U11, U17 and U18. The Essen tram network also has seven "classic" tram lines with around 52 kilometres of track. These tram lines run on metre gauge tracks and run underground in the centre of Essen. While sections are built as Stadtbahn lines, partly in tunnel, and have stations with high platforms, there are also tram lines used only by low-floor trams serving stops with low platforms. An exception is the underground section of the southern route to Bredeney where the stations are served by a mixture of high-platform and low-platform rollingstock and therefore the stations have to be adapted for both types of vehicle.

The four-track station at Essen Hauptbahnhof is the most important point of intersection between the three Stadtbahn lines and four, sometimes five tram lines where it is possible to switch between Stadtbahn trains and trams on the same platform. For this purpose the two different levels of the platform are connected by ramps. The platforms are arranged so that it is possible to transfer across the platform between trains and trams running to the north and between trains and trams running to the south. A bridge spans the entire underground station that is accessible by lifts, providing an easy interchange and a barrier-free transfer for the disabled to trains running in opposite directions. Stadtbahn cars and trams share several other stations. Tram lines 101 and 107 run on the southern section of the Stadtbahn tunnel from Essen Hauptbahnhof to Martinstraße, using the high platforms of the Stadtbahn. Therefore, the high-floor tramcars use fold-up steps on these two lines. This line is equipped with dual gauge track with three rails to cater for the different track gauges.

All three Stadtbahn lines run to the same pattern: services on each line run during the peak hour at 10-minute intervals, in the evenings and on weekends or public holidays at 15-minute intervals and late in the evening at 30-minute intervals. During trade fairs, services on line U11 run on weekends at 10-minute intervals; between Messe (fair ground) and Berliner Platz they sometimes even run at 5-minute intervals. Operations end on all three lines at about 23:00.

History 

During the building of the first tramline in Essen in 1893, planning began on a partially underground railway, which was not realised until decades after the Second World War. The first preliminary line of the current Stadtbahn emerged in the early 1960s and were laid partly as tram tracks on the median strip of the Ruhrschnellweg (“Ruhr Expressway”), which is exactly where the modern line U18 runs. In this case, an underground Stadtbahn (U-Stadtbahn) was not initially planned. Construction work on the tram line in the Ruhr Expressway was carried out simultaneously with the upgrade of the Ruhr Expressway itself, since the latter up to that time had only three lanes and flat junctions and had insufficient capacity because of the large increase in traffic. Following the upgrade of other forms of public transport, the possibility of some form of public transport on the Ruhr Expressway were considered, including express buses on a separate bus lane. Ultimately, however, an option based around a rapid tramway gained favour. Thus a line was built on parts of today's Essen–Mülheim route, which was initially connected by temporary exit ramps with the rest of the tram network.

The plans for a tunnel under the centre of Essen replacing an above-ground tram line began in 1961. Again, there were considerations of relieving the above-ground tramway and congestion in the quite small Essen inner city (about 1,400 × 700 metres), which suffered from increasing traffic. The initial solutions ranged similarly from the retention of the surface tramway with the creation of a new centralised node, up to the creation of a pure U-Bahn (metro) system as in Berlin and Hamburg. For various reasons, however, it was agreed to build an underground tramway with the possibility of future upgrade to a full U-Bahn. The idea of building a pure U-Bahn system at once was considered, but discarded due to the need to handle the existing passenger flows linking the tramway systems of the neighbouring cities of the Ruhr.

	
Soon after that actual planning started on the tunnels in the city centre. The planning was carried out simultaneously on the construction of a highway tunnel for the Ruhr Expressway underneath the inner city. In the end, the so-called Y-Lösung ("Y solution") was adopted under which the Essen Hauptbahnhof Stadtbahn station became a central, four-track junction station serving all lines, which a branch in the north to the northeast and the northwest. The first construction project was the establishment of the shell of Planckstraße station in 1964, which was later used for the connection to the existing above-ground tram line to Margarethenhoehe. The first section of the underground tram line to go into operation, however, was a 552-metre-long urban tunnel section through Saalbau station, opened on 5 October 1967. This was also the first part of the entire underground tram (U-Straßenbahn) network of the Rhine-Ruhr region, since Saalbau station was also the first underground railway station in North Rhine-Westphalia.

The next phase of construction was the building of the continuous Stadtbahn line from Essen to Mülheim along the Ruhr Expressway, which, as has already been mentioned, was partly built in the 1960s. This route was considered a "model line" for the other Stadtbahn construction projects. On 28 May 1977, the opening of a nearly eight kilometre-long, continuous connection between Mülheim-Heißen and the Essen inner city took place, including the underground stations of Heißen Kirche in Mülheim city and the metro stations of Bismarckplatz, Essen Hauptbahnhof and Wiener Platz (now Hirschlandplatz) in Essen. This was the first Stadtbahn line of the network that was completely independent of the tram network to be opened. Porscheplatz (now called Rathaus Essen) Stadtbahn station was also put into operation on 28 May 1977; it was (and still is) operated by trams. The commissioning of the remaining five underground stations in Mülheim followed on 3 November 1979.

In 1981, the route of line U17 to Margarethenhoehe was put into operation. This included Planckstraße station, which had been built as a shell in the 1960s along with its associated ramp. The surface stations initially had low platforms located on the outside of the tracks, which were raised in 2002 and relocated onto islands between the tracks. At the same time, the two underground stations of Berliner Platz and Universität Essen (University) were opened; both are also stations on line U18 and Universität Essen is a station on line U17.

The next construction phase now included for the first time the construction of an underground section on the outskirts of Essen, namely the building of the so-called southern line (Südstrecke) from the existing Saalbau station towards Messe/Gruga and Bredeney. This line was equipped with dual gauge track with three rails for both Stadtbahn and tramway operations to Martinstraße station; south of that station the lines branch to form pairs of metre gauge and standard gauge track. This included four underground Stadtbahn stations for line U11 and, south of the junction, an underground tram station at Florastraße. Services started in 1986.

	
The last major phase of construction to date was the northern extension, carried out in two stages. In 1998, the tunnel was finished from Universität Essen station to Altenessen station. Three years later, the section was opened to Karlsplatz and up the ramp to the surface station of II. Schichtstraße. U11 services ended at Karlsplatz, while U17 services continue to Gelsenkirchen, the above ground section north of Karlsplatz was upgraded up to 2001 on the route on an earlier metre-gauge tram line for standard gauge Stadtbahn operations. The Gelsenkirchen section of line U17 ended from 2001 to 2004 at Fischerstraße. Two extra stations in Gelsenkirchen, Schloss Horst and Buerer Straße, were taken into operation in 2004. From January 2010, line U11 operated to Gelsenkirchen Buerer Straße, replacing line U17, which now ran only as far as Berliner Platz. Line U18 was called a "shopping line" and continued to Karlsplatz station. Since September 2011, line U11 continues to Gelsenkirchen Buerer Straße and line U17 has replaced line U18 to Karlsplatz. Line U18 has run since September 2011 between Mülheim Hauptbahnhof and Berliner Platz in Essen.

Lines and stations 

The  Essen Stadtbahn system includes a  underground trunk line through the centre of Essen and four outer branches, each of which is served by one or two Stadtbahn services. The Stadtbahn serves 45 stations. The main line is the section between Essen Hauptbahnhof and Berliner Platz, which is served by all three Stadtbahn lines. The northern section between Berliner Platz and Karlsplatz is served by lines U11 and U17. The line between the Essen Hauptbahnhof and Bismarckplatz station is served by lines U17 and U18, while the other lines are served by only one service.

The lines in detail 

The numbering of the line follows the VRR’s system for Stadtbahn lines, which is composed as follows: the preceding "U" indicates that it is a Stadtbahn line that is largely or completely separated from traffic and that it is not a tram or bus line. This is followed by a number that represents the area of the transport lines, in Essen and Mülheim this is 1. The second digit is the local line number, which in Essen is not assigned in consecutive order, but instead reflects the number of the tram line that it replaced or which ran nearby.

U11: GE-Horst Buerer Str.–E-Messe West-Süd / Gruga 

The route of line U11 since the timetable change in January 2010 is no longer fully separated from other traffic. It runs completely underground from the ramp from II Schichtstr. to Messe Ost / Gruga, except that the southern terminus at Messe Süd / Gruga is in a cutting. Line U11 is an important fast connection between the northern district of Altenessen and the exhibition ground (Messe) and Gruga Park in the southern suburbs. This line passes under through the city centre with the two interchanges to tram lines at Berliner Platz and Essen Hauptbahnhof. Line U11 serves a total of 23 stations.

U17: Karlsplatz–Margarethenhöhe 

Line U17 is the shortest of the three Stadtbahn lines and has 17 stations. It runs from Karlsplatz station in Altenessen to Margarethenhöhe, a garden suburb in the south of Essen. The section from Karlsplatz to the Planckstraße ramp, including all the intermediate stations, is underground, while the rest of the line is above ground and, in contrast to line U18, has several at-grade intersections. In the southern region near the terminus of Margarethenhöhe, parts of the line are single track. In 2002, the last above-ground stations on line U17 were equipped with high platforms that are accessible for the disabled, making entries and exits on the entire Essen Stadtbahn system fully accessible.

U18: Berliner Platz–Mülheim Hbf 

Line U18 has had 17 stations, since the timetable change in September 2011 and is the only completely grade-separated line of the Essen Stadtbahn. It links Essen city in the east with Mulheim an der Ruhr in the West, with nine stations in Mülheim. This includes the four-track terminus of Mülheim (Ruhr) Hauptbahnhof, which connects to the trams towards Duisburg, among other things. Line U18 is built to full rapid transit standard, but large parts of the line run above ground. The section between Heißen Kirche and Bismarckplatz is largely built between the carriageways of the Ruhr Expressway and there are small elevated sections in Mülheim. Line U18 was called a “shopping line”  from 7 January 2010 to September 2011 because it had stations near the shopping areas of the Allee-Center Altenessen, Limbecker Platz, the Rhein-Ruhr-Zentrum in the Essen inner city and the Forum Mülheim.

Line network before the timetable change of 2010 

Before the change of timetable at the beginning of 2010, the lines ran as follows:
U11: Karlsplatz–Essen-Altenessen–Universität–Berliner Platz–Essen Hbf–Rüttenscheid–Messe/Gruga
U17: Gelsenkirchen-Horst–Essen-Altenessen–Universität–Berliner Platz–Essen Hbf–Holsterhausen–Margarethenhöhe
U18: Berliner Platz–Essen Hbf–Rhein-Ruhr-Zentrum–Mülheim Hbf

Line network after January 2010 

With the timetable change on 7 January 2010, the rail network was reorganised. The lines operated as follows:
U11: Gelsenkirchen-Horst–Essen-Altenessen–Universität–Berliner Platz–Essen Hbf–Rüttenscheid–Messe/Gruga
U17: Berliner Platz–Essen Hbf–Holsterhausen–Margarethenhöhe
U18: Karlsplatz–Essen-Altenessen–Universität–Berliner Platz–Essen Hbf–Rhein-Ruhr-Zentrum–Mülheim Hbf

With this change, line U11 lost its character as a line built fully to rapid transit standards. Only line U18 retains this, but the link to the fairgrounds (Messe) for the residents of the northern suburbs of Essen and the city of Gelsenkirchen has been significantly improved. The residents of Altenessen have gained a direct connection to Mülheim and the Rhein-Ruhr-Zentrum. With the new route of line U18, the large shopping centres of Essen and Mülheim were directly connected to each other (the Allee-Center Altenessen, Limbecker Platz, Essen inner city, the Rhein-Ruhr-Zentrum and the Forum Mülheim). The operation of the particularly well-used section from Essen Hbf to the University continues to run at 5-minute intervals.

The operation of coupled sets on line U17 during peak hour only is being considered. According to the EVAG the operation of triple sets on the Karlsplatz–Messe/Gruga route would be possible.

Line network since September 2011 

In September 2011, U17 services were extended from Berliner Platz to Karlsplatz and U18 was cut back on the same section of line:
U11: Gelsenkirchen-Horst–Essen-Altenessen–Universität–Berliner Platz–Essen Hbf–Rüttenscheid–Messe/Gruga
U17 Karlsplatz–Essen-Altenessen–Universität–Berliner Platz–Essen Hbf–Holsterhausen–Margarethenhöhe
U18: Berliner Platz–Essen Hbf–Rhein-Ruhr-Zentrum–Mülheim Hbf

List of all stations

Rolling stock 

Two different types of electric multiple units are now used on the three Essen Stadtbahn lines.

Stadtbahn-B cars 

Stadtbahnwagen B (light rail B cars) were procured between 1976 and 1985 and are still used today on all three lines. Originally, these cars were provided with fold-up steps that allow entries and exits at stops without platforms or with low platforms. However, since all stations have now been equipped with uniformly high platforms, these steps are being removed in the course of the current rollingstock upgrades (which includes the incorporation of surveillance cameras in the carriages, new paintwork, new matrix displays inside and LED advertising outside). The Stadtbahn-B cars run in Essen in single and double sets. In 2007, a total of 31 Stadtbahn-B cars were in use on the Essen Stadtbahn, including 24 owned by EVAG. The other seven of these vehicles were owned by the Mülheimer VerkehrsGesellschaft (MVG/Mülheim Transport Company), since EVAG and MVG merged in 2017 all vehicles are owned by the new Ruhrbahn

P86/P89 light rail vehicles 

Class P86 and P89 light rail vehicles were purchased from 1991. The class P86 (P for Poplar DLR depot, 86 for the year) vehicles were originally built by Linke-Hofmann-Busch for London's Docklands Light Railway (DLR) and used at its opening in 1986. However, since they did not meet British safety standards for use in tunnels, the DLR could not use these vehicles on the DLR’s extension to Bank, which was opened in 1991. Therefore, DLR sold its 11 P86 vehicles, which at that time were only a few years old, to EVAG, which at the time needed more vehicles for its planned route extensions. In 1989, DLR procured ten P89 vehicles from British Rail Engineering Limited for route extensions. These cars were very similar to the P86 vehicles, but could be operated to Bank. Due to strong traffic growth and other route extensions, DLR procured new, more modern vehicles that could be used in trains of up to three sets. The installation of DLR’s new Alcatel SelTrac train control system would have meant that the P89 sets would have had to be rebuilt in order to maintain them in operation. They also could not be operated in coupled sets in the DLR’s tunnel sections due to their lack of connecting doors. As a result, after only a few years of operation in London, the P89 sets were also sold to EVAG. All the acquired DLR vehicles were converted by EVAG for their use in Essen. Among other things, driving cabs and rooftop pantographs had to be retrofitted, as these cars had been driven automatically in London and used bottom contact third rail while the Essen Stadtbahn uses overhead electrification. The braking system also had to be modified. The P86 sets have been further modernised since 2005 in order to extend their service on the Essen Stadtbahn network, with the converted sets classified as P86U. In this case, the red and blue paint of the DLR was replaced by the yellow and blue EVAG colour scheme, which was used by the P89 sets since their first day of operation in Essen. The P86U and P89 cars are used on all three lines in Essen, while the not yet converted P86 cars are run just on line U18 due to their braking limitations.

Expansion plans 

One project is the above-ground extension of line U17 from the current terminus of Margarethenhöhe to the south through three stations. An alternative extension of line U11 to the south has also been examined.

In addition, there are plans to replace the old high-floor tram cars with their folding steps which are used on lines 101 and 107, which share the line with U11 from Essen Hauptbahnhof to Martinstraße. It was proposed to upgrade the southern section to Bredeney to standard gauge as Stadtbahn line U12, but this was eventually rejected by the city of Essen. The current plans envisage the partial lowering of the platforms in the southern tunnel. This would allow the tram on lines 101 and 107 to continue to operate to Bredeney and the future operation of low-floor trams. The high-floor platforms would be slightly elevated and thus would provide stepless entries and exits for line U11 services. However, the operation of three-car sets to the Messe on line U11 through these stations would no longer be possible. A change to low-floor trams on line 107 would be possible in the medium term and the purchase of new of low-floor vehicles is planned from 2012.

Underground stations in pre-metro mode 

1 Interchange station: U-Stadtbahn above, tram under
2 Shared by U-Stadtbahn and trams at same platform
3 Shared by U-Stadtbahn and trams at different platforms

As part of the planning for the Stadtbahn in the 1970s other tunnels would have been built, including an underground east–west connection, that would have involved existing tram routes. The project as a whole consisted of about 30 kilometres of tunnels, the complete re-gauging of all lines to standard gauge and the elimination of all tram lines that were not covered by these plans. The plan was targeted for completion in 2008. Up to this point, the stations that had already been built in the city centre and in Ruettenscheid would still be operated by trams in pre-metro mode (Stadtbahn-Vorlaufbetrieb). However, these plans were found to be too financially ambitious and could not be pursued. The construction of underground railway in Essen officially ended with the inauguration of the northern line in 2001. The stations built and used by trams in pre-metro mode remain, with all their shortcomings.

Tickets and fares 

The fares of the Verkehrsverbund Rhein-Ruhr (Rhine-Ruhr transport association, VRR) apply to journeys on the Essen Stadtbahn, as well as on the trams and other public transport in the city.

See also 
 Trams in Essen
 Rhine-Ruhr Stadtbahn
 Verkehrsverbund Rhein-Ruhr

References

Inline references

Bibliography

External links  

 EVAG (official website)  
 Plan of Essen public transport network, including Stadtbahn (VRR) (PDF; 6.01 MB) 
 Light rail and trams in Essen  
 UrbanRail.net - Essen
 Rollingstock list with photos of Essen Stadtbahn cars 

Light rail in Germany
Tram transport in Germany
Underground rapid transit in Germany
Transport in Essen
Railway lines in highway medians